The Jammu and Kashmir Legislative Council (also known as the Jammu and Kashmir Vidhan Parishad) was the upper house of the legislature of the erstwhile state of Jammu and Kashmir, India.

History
The first Legislature was established by the government of the then-Maharaja of Kashmir, Hari Singh, in 1934. In 1957, a new constitution was adopted by the constituent assembly and the Parliament of India passed the Legislative Councils Act. These two pieces of legislation created a bicameral legislature for Jammu and Kashmir.

In August 2019, an act was passed the Indian Parliament, which reorganised the erstwhile state of Jammu and Kashmir into two union territories of Jammu and Kashmir and Ladakh on 31 October 2019. The new union territory of Jammu and Kashmir will elect a unicameral legislature from this date onwards. The Legislative Council of Jammu and Kashmir was formally abolished on 16 October 2019.

Membership and Tenure

The council was governed according to the Indian Constitution and acts of the Indian Parliament. The eligibility criteria for membership in the Legislative Council is given below:

 Council member must be a citizen of India. 
 Council member must be at least 30 years of age.
 Council member must meet any additional requirements stipulated in an act of Parliament.
 Council member cannot hold any office of profit, other than a ministerial position, in the Union or state government(s), and must resign from any such office upon their election.
 Council member cannot be a member of any other Indian house of parliament.
 Council member must be of sound mind and physical health as determined by the court of competent jurisdiction.

Members of the Legislative Councils served staggered six-year terms, with one-third of the members are eligible for re-election every two years. Unlike the lower house, the composition of the council was not determined by direct popular vote.

The Council's membership was strictly limited to 40 seats. However, as per section 50 of the then state constitution, the Jammu and Kashmir Legislative Council was composed of 36 seats.

Composition of Legislative Council
Legislative Council consisted of 36 members, chosen in the following manner: 
 11 members were elected by the members of the Legislative Assembly from among the residents of the Province of Kashmir, including at least one resident each from Leh Tehsil and Kargil Tehsil. 
 11 members were elected by the members of the Legislative Assembly from among the residents of the Province of Jammu, including at least one resident each from the Doda District and from the Poonch District.
 1 member was elected from among the municipal council, town area committees, and notified area committees in both the Province of Kashmir and the Province of Jammu. Two members are selected using this process. 
 2 members were elected by the members of the Panchayats and other local bodies in both the Province of Kashmir and the Province of Jammu. Four members are selected using this process.
 8 members were nominated by the Governor of Jammu and Kashmir. Three or few members belong to any of the socially or economically backward classes in the State. The other council members are selected based on their special knowledge or practical experience in areas of literature, science, art, co-operative movement and social service.

Functions
The Legislative Council had two regular sessions — Budget and Monsoon sessions. But these sessions could be convened at any time by the state governor.</ref> The Council lacks many of the powers and responsibilities that are bestowed to the Legislative Assembly. While the members of the Legislative Council could introduce any form of legislation except bills concerning financial appropriations, in practice the lower house was the source of most legislation and bills passed by the Assembly were only sent to the Legislative Council for final approval.

The Council was required to decide on any appropriation bill sent by the Assembly within 14 days. Legislation not concerning appropriations may be decided upon within three months. Whether a bill was an ordinary bill or a money bill was decided by the Speaker of the Vidhan Sabha.

Nevertheless, the Vidhan Parishad had some influence over the state of Jammu and Kashmir. The main powers of the council were:
 As a permanent House of the Jammu and Kashmir State Legislature, the council not subjected to dissolution. 
 Legislative Council can send bills back to the Legislative Assembly for reconsideration, with or without recommendations. 
 Legislative Council can delay the approval of bills for up to six months (two considerations).

Office-Bearers
The Legislative Council was headed by a Chairman and Deputy Chairman elected by the members of the Council. The Leader of the House was the leader of the party (or coalition) holding the most number of seats in the council. The Leader of the Opposition represents the second-largest party or coalition.

Notes

References

 
Politics of Jammu and Kashmir
State upper houses in India
Defunct upper houses in India